First Lady or First Gentleman of Argentina, also known as First Lady or First Gentleman of the Argentine Nation, is the unofficial and protocol title of the spouse of the sitting president of Argentina.

Role
The first lady or first gentleman is not an elected position, carries no official duties and brings no salary. Nonetheless, he or she participates in humanitarian and charitable work. Furthermore, many have taken an active role in campaigning for the president with whom they are associated. 

Some facts about the first ladies and gentlemen of Argentina:

 Juana del Pino y Vera Mujica, whom born in Uruguay and Regina Pacini, whom born in Portugal are the only two First Ladies of Argentina who were born in a foreign country.
Eva Perón (1919–1952), First Lady from 1946 until her death, was the most important and influential First Lady, known for her work in many charitable and feminist causes. Before her death, the Argentine Congress named her the "Spiritual Leader of the Nation". 
Isabel Perón was the first First Lady to become the President of Argentina in 1974. 
Zulema Yoma, is the first First Lady of Argentina in the history of her country of Arab descent.
Zulema María Eva Menem, nicknamed Zulemita, was the first and only presidential daughter, officially known to act as a first lady. 
Cristina Fernández, former First Lady from 2003 to 2007 was the first woman democratically elected President of Argentina.
Néstor Kirchner (1950–2010), former Argentine president, was the only First Gentleman of Argentina.

List
This list included all persons who served as first ladies or first gentlemen, regardless of whether they were married to the incumbent president or not, as well as persons who are considered to have acted as first lady .

Presidential couples gallery

References

 
Lists of Argentine people
Argentina

es:Anexo:Primeras damas y primeros caballeros de la Nación Argentina
id:Daftar istri dan suami presiden Argentina